Road Warrior is a limited 7" vinyl released by Black Tide in 2008. It features a live recording of the song "Warriors of Time" from their debut album Light from Above on the B-side and a cover of Iron Maiden's "Prowler". "Prowler" was originally released on the Kerrang! compilation Maiden Heaven Iron Maiden tribute CD as well as the band's CD single for the song "Shout". The cover is a scene from the music video for "Shockwave". It was the last release to feature rhythm guitarist Alex Nuñez.

This EP is also available on iTunes, but as two separate singles. The physical 7" version was strictly a limited edition collector's item for fans.

Track listing

Personnel
 Gabriel Garcia: vocals, lead guitar
 Alex Nuñez: rhythm guitar, backing vocals
 Zakk Sandler: Bass guitar, backing vocals
 Steven Spence: drums, percussion

References

2008 debut EPs
Black Tide albums
Interscope Records EPs
Speed metal EPs